The America Zone was one of the two regional zones of the 1925 International Lawn Tennis Challenge.

9 teams entered the America Zone, with the winner going on to compete in the Inter-Zonal Final against the winner of the Europe Zone. Australia defeated Japan in the final, and went on to face France in the Inter-Zonal Final.

Draw

First round

Cuba vs. Spain

Quarterfinals

Mexico vs. Spain

Semifinals

Canada vs. Australia

Japan vs. Spain

Final

Australia vs. Japan

References

External links
Davis Cup official website

Davis Cup Americas Zone
America Zone
International Lawn Tennis Challenge